Andrew Charles Crawford (born 1949)  is a British neuroscientist. He is a professor at the Department of Physiology, Development and Neuroscience of the University of Cambridge and a Fellow of Trinity College.

Education
Crawford was educated at King Edward VI Camp Hill School for Boys in Birmingham and Downing College, Cambridge, where he was awarded a Bachelor of Arts degree in 1970. He moved to Emmanuel College, Cambridge, and was awarded his PhD in 1974.

Research 
Crawford is known for his studies of the mechanism of hearing in vertebrates. In 1976, he and Robert Fettiplace developed a method of recording the electrical responses of hair cells in the isolated cochlea of reptiles. He has also published a series of important papers on neuromuscular transmission in frogs and crabs.

Awards and honours 
Crawford was elected a Fellow of the Royal Society (FRS) in 1990.

References 

Living people
Fellows of the Royal Society
Fellows of Trinity College, Cambridge
British neuroscientists
Place of birth missing (living people)
People educated at King Edward VI Camp Hill School for Boys
1949 births